Choi Yun-kyum is a South Korean football manager at K League 2 side joining recently from K3 League, Chungbuk Cheongju FC. He played in the K-League for Yukong Elephants from 1985 to 1992. After he retired, he moved into coaching, firstly as an assistant coach before moving in a head coach position. His second son, Choi Min-ho, is currently a member of the boy band SHINee.

Club career 
Making his first mark on the football field, Choi Yun-Kyum made his debut in the K-League in 1985 as a Yukong Elephants defender. As a player, he appeared in 162 games. He was selected in the National Olympic Team and National A-Team, playing 5 games at international level. He also had a chance to play in the 1988 Seoul Olympics. He retired as a football player in 1992.

Managerial career 
After retirement, Choi decided to live the so-called "footballer's second life" by becoming a coach. He started his coaching life as a Training Coach at Bucheon SK, since renamed Yukong Elephants. Two years later, he was promoted as a Coach. Four years later, he was chosen to become the Assistant Coach. Finally, after years of diligence, Choi was appointed as Bucheon SK's head coach for the 2001 season. However, though he had no problems with the team and was able to lead it fairly well, the Bucheon SK board decided to change their manager. Bucheon SK's fans protested, but the decision wasn't reversed.

In 2003, after the poor results of their 2002 season, Daejeon Citizen selected Choi as their coach. Choi, originally from Daejeon, willingly came back to his hometown. The lack of results in 2002 was frustrating for fans and players, and confidence was low. However, Choi inspired the team and completely changed it by implementing the 4-3-3 formation. The outcome was a near miraculous recovery from 2002, and he, together with Daejeon Citizen F.C., coined the catchphrase "Miracle 2003". Daejeon Citizen finished the 2003 season in 6th place, its best finish ever in the league, and at the same improved its average home game attendance to about 18,000 people. After 2003, although Daejeon Citizen was not able to make repeat its result of 2003, Choi was still considered a hero at the Daejeon World Cup Stadium. He continued his role as manager into the 2007 K-League season, before being replaced mid-season by Kim Ho.

In addition to his excellent management skills, Choi is also famous for his humble personality - a key factor in ensuring a harmonious team. "I want to make this the team that a player chooses on his own volition, and not by my own will or force. I shall not buy abilities and just gather the best players. This will be a team played by humans, a team that players love, and a team who dreams the same dreams as the fans."

On October 10, 2011, he signed a one-year contract to V-League's Hoàng Anh Gia Lai - one of the most popular football club of Vietnam.

Choi returned to the K League 2 managing Gangwon FC in 2015. He managed to lead them to the K League 1 via the playoffs in 2016.

In 2018, Choi left Gangwon to become the manager of K League 2 team Busan IPark, but resigned after only one season after failing to gain promotion. Busan IPark finished third in the K League 2 but lost to FC Seoul in the promotion/relegation playoff final.

In 2019, Choi joined Jeju United FC, but left from the club as manager.

In 2022, Choi signed K League 2 side joining from K3 League, Cheongju FC from 2023 season.

Club career statistics

Managerial statistics

External links
  
 
 

1962 births
Living people
Association football defenders
South Korean footballers
South Korea international footballers
South Korean football managers
Jeju United FC players
Jeju United FC managers
Daejeon Hana Citizen FC managers
Gangwon FC managers
K League 1 players
Footballers at the 1988 Summer Olympics
Olympic footballers of South Korea
Sportspeople from Daejeon
Expatriate football managers in Vietnam
Incheon National University alumni